Beinn Loinne (also known as Druim nan Cnamh) (789 m) is a mountain in the Northwest Highlands of Scotland. It rises above the southern shore of Loch Cluanie in Inverness-shire.

The mountain takes the form of a long ridge, and although a familiar sight from the A87 road between Kintail and Glen Moriston it is still a remote peak. The nearest village is Dalchreichart to the east.

References

Mountains and hills of the Northwest Highlands
Marilyns of Scotland
Corbetts